Kall is a smaller locality located in Åre Municipality, Jämtland County, Sweden with a population of 107 inhabitants. The parish church of Kalls Kyrka in Kall Parish is located within the smaller locality.

References 

Populated places in Jämtland County